Hoboken Charter School is a K-12 charter school in Hoboken, in Hudson County, New Jersey, United States.

As of the 2021–22 school year, the school had an enrollment of 298 students and 28.2 classroom teachers (on an FTE basis), for a student–teacher ratio of 10.6:1. There were 58 students (19.5% of enrollment) eligible for free lunch and 7 (2.3% of students) eligible for reduced-cost lunch.

History
On January 15, 1997, Leo Klagholz, the New Jersey Commissioner of Education, enacted the school's charter. The school opened in 1997 with classes in the Demarest Building and had its charter extended for five years in 2001. In 2010, the school moved its K-8 students into the former Academy of the Sacred Heart building.

In 2012, the K-8 building was hit by a fire categorized as three alarm; it would be unavailable until September 2013. The former St. Anne's School (of the Roman Catholic Archdiocese of Newark) in Jersey City Heights was the temporary class location. Additionally Hurricane Sandy in late 2012 had disrupted operations of the school.

In 2013 Arne Duncan, U.S. Secretary of Education in the Obama administration, released a YouTube video praising the school.

Athletics
The Hoboken Charter High School Cougars compete independently in interscholastic sports under the supervision of the New Jersey State Interscholastic Athletic Association (NJSIAA).

References

External links
 Hoboken Charter School

1997 establishments in New Jersey
Educational institutions established in 1997
Hoboken, New Jersey
Buildings and structures in Hoboken, New Jersey
Public high schools in Hudson County, New Jersey
Schools in Hudson County, New Jersey
K-12 schools in New Jersey
Charter schools in New Jersey